Maesiella punctatostriata is a species of sea snail, a marine gastropod mollusk in the family Pseudomelatomidae, the turrids and allies.

Description
The length of the shell attains 18 mm.

Distribution
This species occurs in the Pacific Ocean off Mazatlan, Mexico and off Panama

References

External links
 H. A. Pilsbry and H. N. Lowe, West Mexican and Central American Mollusks Collected by H. N. Lowe, 1929-31; Proceedings of the Academy of Natural Sciences of Philadelphia Vol. 84 (1932), pp. 33-144
 
 

punctatostriata
Gastropods described in 1856
Taxa named by Philip Pearsall Carpenter